Georg "Goggi" Hólm (born 6 April 1976) is the bassist of the Icelandic post-rock band Sigur Rós. He is the most prominent member of Sigur Rós in the English press, as he does significantly more press than the other members due to him being the most fluent English speaker in the band.

Biography

Personal life
He has a wife named Svanhvít Tryggvadóttir. They were married in 2005 by Hilmar Örn Hilmarsson, the allsherjargoði of Ásatrúarfélagið. Georg's father, Haukur, is a news reporter on a local TV station, Stöð 2 (Channel 2). He is the only member of Sigur Rós without a patronymic name: the majority of Icelanders have a patronym rather than surname. The song "Salka", a former live only song, released on Hvarf/Heim in 2007, is named after his stepdaughter.

Georg has two brothers; one of them is a guitarist in For a Minor Reflection, Kjartan Dagur Hólm (1989).

Professional life
He and Jónsi are the remaining founding members of Sigur Rós. He sometimes plays using a cello bow. As do other members of Sigur Rós, he plays multiple instruments during a typical live show. This often includes, in addition to electric and acoustic bass guitars, keyboards, glockenspiel, and drums.

A few days before the release of the album Valtari, a quote was shown on Sigur Rós band's official website saying: "I really can’t remember why we started this record, I no longer know what we were trying to do back then. I do know session after session went pear-shaped, we lost focus and almost gave up...did give up for a while. But then something happened and form started to emerge, and now I can honestly say that it’s the only Sigur Rós record I have listened to for pleasure in my own house after we’ve finished it." - Georg

References

External links

1976 births
Alternative rock bass guitarists
Living people
Icelandic bass guitarists
Icelandic musicians
Sigur Rós members
21st-century bass guitarists